The talking stick, also called a speaker's staff, is an instrument of aboriginal democracy used by many tribes, especially those of indigenous peoples of the Northwest Coast in North America. The talking stick may be passed around a group, as multiple people speak in turn, or used only by leaders as a symbol of their authority and right to speak in public.

Akan chiefs in Western Africa have a tradition of speaker's staffs capped with gold-leafed finials. These emerged in the 19th century as a symbol of the holder's power.

Carved ceremonial talking sticks called tokotoko in Maori are used as symbols of authority in formal public speaking events throughout New Zealand.

Northwest Coast art

In the Northwest Coast, talking sticks are carved wooden staffs, which can either bear a single crest at the top or be fully carved with heraldic clan crests of the chief or hereditary political spokesman. The staffs can include shell inlay. The staffs resemble small totem poles and are still used ceremonially today. At gatherings, especially potlatches, a chief or his designated speaker holds the talking stick and publicly announces message. The speaker thumps the stick on the ground for emphasis. A feather has been used as a stand-in for the talking stick.

Talking sticks are a contemporary Northwest Coast art form with great symbolic importance. Tsimshian woodcarver David A. Boxley was commissioned to sculpt a crown of a talking stick for the 1990 Goodwill Games, that incorporated symbolism of the United States and Russia. This staff was carried from Spokane, Washington to Oregon and on to Seattle, Washington by participating athletes. Talking sticks are also incorporated into totem poles. In 1988 Kwakwaka'wakw Richard Hunt carved the world's largest totem pole featuring a Cedar Man wielding a 4.3 meter (14 foot) tall talking stick. Representations of chiefs are carved in totem poles carrying talking sticks as well as coppers.

See also
Ruyi
Sceptre

Notes

References
 Shearer, Cindy. Understanding Northwest Coast Art: A Guide to Crests, Beings, and Symbols. Vancouver: Douglas & McIntyre, 2000. .
 Stewart, Hillary and Norman Tait. Looking at Totem Poles. Vancouver: Douglas & McIntyre, 1993. .
 Wade, Edwin L. The Arts of the North American Indian: Native Traditions in Evolution. Hudson Hills, 1995. .
 Werness, Hope B. Continuum Encyclopedia of Native Art. Continuum International Publishing Group, 2003. .

Further reading
Cultural anthropology: the human challenge, William A. Haviland, Harald E. L. Prins, and Dana Walrath, 2007, source
Researching the culture in agri-culture, Michael M. Cernea, and Amir H. Kassam, 2005, source

Native American tools
Northwest Coast art
Indigenous woodcarving of the Americas